Gäufelden station is a railway station in the municipality of Gäufelden, located in the Böblingen district in Baden-Württemberg, Germany.

References

Railway stations in Baden-Württemberg
Buildings and structures in Böblingen (district)